The Sword of Hope, released in Japan as , is a 1989 first-person RPG for the Game Boy, developed by Kemco and published by Seika Corporation.

In 1992, it received a sequel, The Sword of Hope II. In 1998, these two games were rereleased in Japan as a single Game Boy cartridge, Selection I & II. The Sword of Hope has also been released for the 3DS Virtual Console, albeit in Japan only.

A sequel titled  was released for mobile phones on 2008.

Summary
The player assumes the role of Prince Theo whose father, King Hennessy has become corrupt and maniacal with power. He has enslaved the kingdom and exiled the great wisemen who once maintained the balance and prosperity of the kingdom. Theo's mother, Queen Remy, was killed by Hennessy but Theo was rescued from the castle without harm with the help of an old sage. Now that Theo has reached his teenage years and become a skilled warrior it is time for Theo to face his destiny and return to the castle where he was raised and defeat his father.

Each boss has his own weakness; exploiting it to defeat him is completely up to the player.

External links
The Sword of Hope at GameFAQs
Selection: Erabareshi Mono at Nintendo.co.jp 
Selection: Erabareshi Mono at GB no Game Seiha Shimasho

1991 video games
Fantasy video games
Game Boy games
Kemco games
Role-playing video games
Seika Corporation games
Video games developed in Japan
Virtual Console games
Virtual Console games for Nintendo 3DS